The Nigeria national rugby league team represents Nigeria in international rugby league football competitions.
They made their debut in the 2019 Middle East Africa Championship with a 23-12 victory over Ghana.

Current squad
Squad for 2019 MEA Rugby League Championship;
Bolu Fagborun
Jude Abrackson
Joshua Effiong
Gabriel John
Alex Richard
Samuel Akpabio
Nuhu Ibrahim
Shakirudeen Alameen
Nelson Celestine
Habib Isazka
Steven James
Temitope Olawale
Kiki Stephen
Precious John
Kelvin Azuka
David Olwale
Sulymon Oyebola
Stephen Akpawan
Malu Williams
Sadiq Adebiyi
Jubril Olajude
Isah Lawal-Saulawa

Results

Notable players
Sadiq Adebiyi
Eribe Doro
Bolu Fagborun
Jamal Idris
Muizz Mustapha
Martin Offiah
Jayden Okunbor
Michael Worrincy
Rob Worrincy

See also

Nigeria Rugby League
Rugby league in Africa

References

External links

National rugby league teams
National sports teams of Nigeria
Rugby league in Africa